The 1988–89 season was Paris Saint-Germain's 19th season in existence. PSG played their home league games at the Parc des Princes in Paris, registering an average attendance of 17,502 spectators per match. The club was presided by Francis Borelli and the team was coached by Tomislav Ivić. Oumar Sène was the team captain.

Summary

Paris Saint-Germain briefly bounced back from crisis under Tomislav Ivić in 1988–89, fighting for the championship with Marseille. In May 1989, the two sides met for the title decider at the Stade Vélodrome. Played out amid an electric atmosphere, the title looked to be heading to league leaders Paris with the score tied at 0–0 and only a few seconds remaining. But a 25-yard shot from Franck Sauzée surprised PSG goalkeeper Joël Bats as Marseille leapfrogged them at the top of the table to clinch the trophy.

Players 

As of the 1988–89 season.

Squad

Out on loan

Transfers 

As of the 1988–89 season.

Arrivals

Departures

Kits 

French radio RTL and French television network La Cinq were the shirt sponsors. German sportswear brand Adidas was the kit manufacturer.

Friendly tournaments

Tournoi de Paris

Tournoi Indoor de Paris-Bercy

First group stage (Group B)

Second group stage (Ranking Group)

Competitions

Overview

Division 1

League table

Results by round

Matches

Coupe de France

Round of 64

Round of 32

Round of 16

Statistics 

As of the 1988–89 season.

Appearances and goals 

|-
!colspan="16" style="background:#dcdcdc; text-align:center"|Goalkeepers

|-
!colspan="16" style="background:#dcdcdc; text-align:center"|Defenders

|-
!colspan="16" style="background:#dcdcdc; text-align:center"|Midfielders

|-
!colspan="16" style="background:#dcdcdc; text-align:center"|Forwards

|-
!colspan="16" style="background:#dcdcdc; text-align:center"|Players transferred / loaned out during the season

|-

References

External links 

Official websites
 PSG.FR - Site officiel du Paris Saint-Germain
 Paris Saint-Germain - Ligue 1 
 Paris Saint-Germain - UEFA.com

Paris Saint-Germain F.C. seasons
French football clubs 1988–89 season